Mouyondzi (can also be written as Muyonzi or Muyondzi) is a district in the Bouenza Region of southern Republic of the Congo. The capital lies at Mouyondzi.

Moyondzi's population mostly consists of Beembe.

Towns and villages

References
Decalo S., Thompson V. & Adloff R. 1984. Historical dictionary of Congo Pg 218–219. USA: The Scarecrow Press, Inc

Bouenza Department
Districts of the Republic of the Congo